Heriot or Heriots may refer to:

Old English for "war-gear", see Anglo-Saxon weaponry
Heriot, the English term used for the   tenurial  relief in feudal Europe,  in French known as le droit du meilleur catel
Heriot, Scottish Borders, a town in the Scottish Borders
Heriot, New Zealand, a township in the South Island of New Zealand
George Heriot (1563–1624), a Scottish goldsmith and philanthropist
George Heriot (artist) (1759 – 22 July 1839), a Scottish-Canadian artist
George Heriot's School, a school he founded in Edinburgh
Heriot's Rugby Club, originally for former pupils of the school
Heriot-Watt University, also named for George Heriot
Heryot, an unidentified poet attested in William Dunbar's Lament for the Makaris

See also
Herriot
Herriott